Jolidon is a Romanian lingerie and swim suit manufacturer, founded in 1993 in Cluj-Napoca. 

In 1993, an entrepreneur, Gabriel Cîrlig, identifies on the Romanian market an after '89 two types of products that are necessary, but briefly represented, the lingerie and the swimsuits. After 27 years of activity, Jolidon products are exported especially to the European Union but also to America and Asia.

In 2000, the company founded Jolidon Hungary KFT in Budapest, then in 2001 Jolidon Italia SRL in Milano. 

Later, it extended to France as Jolidon France SARL, first in Paris, then in Lyon. As of March 2008, Jolidon operates 103 stores, 65 in Romania, 35 in Italy, and 3 in Hungary. It also franchises 10 boutiques in France.
 In addition to these stores, Jolidon is also sold at Uplift Intimate Apparel in Carmel, Indiana, USA.

At the end of 2009, Jolidon's own network totaled 85 stores in Romania.

Number of Employees:
 2009: 3,000
 2008: 3,200
 2012: 2,000

Turnover:
 2011: 31.5 million euros
 2009: 24.2 million euros
 2008: 31.6 million euros
 2007: 60 million euros
 2011: 21 million euros

History 
In 1993, Gabriel Cîrlig, has found that the Romanian market of after 1989 is poor in two types of products, such as lingerie and bathing suits. The first tailory had 3-4 sewing machines – it was a minimum needed to work on lingerie.  

In 1993-1994, it enters the Romanian market, especially in Transylvania.

In 1995-1998, it expands on the Romanian market, the objective was to become a leader.
In 1998, branches are opened in Bucharest and Timișoara.

In 2000 Jolidon established Jolidon Hungary KFT in Budapest, in 2001 Jolidon Italy SRL in Milano, and in 2003 Jolidon France SRL with the headquarters in Paris, and in 2004 Jolidon France opened the headquarters in Lyon.

In 2004, Jolidon  has purchased it main rival at the  Romanian market, it was the Argos Company from Cluj-Napoca with  60-year tradition in tailoring lingerie and swimwear  and over 800 employees.

In 2006, Jolidon took over Flacăra, one of the largest garment factories in Romania, with 1,000 employees, who also owned the Falla brand, for the amount of 800,000 euros. Later, the employees from Flacăra were moved to the Argos’s shed.

In 2007, Jolidon bought the majority stake of the Ineu Knitwear factory.

January 2009 represents the total success of the PRELUDE  brand - a luxury brand from the Jolidon group's portfolio - by winning the Grand Jury Prize and the Specialist Audience Award at SIL 2009, within the event "Ultralingerie".

In 2009, it expanded its business to Ireland and Finland and contracted clients in Dubai, Saudi Arabia, Qatar and South Korea. Its products are exported throughout Europe: Italy, France, Hungary, Germany, Switzerland, Belgium, Slovenia, Croatia, Poland, Latvia, Austria, Cyprus, Malta, but also in America, Canada, Japan, South Africa, Lebanon, Israel or in Asia.

In 2011, Jolidon participates for the 14th time at the International Lingerie Show (SIL) Paris, the most important event in the world of lingerie.

In 2012, Jolidon marks the 15th consecutive participation in SIL Paris, in which he participates with the well-known names of the profile world. Jolidon estimates that it will return on profit this year, after three years of losses, and rely on an advance with 15% of turnover compared to last year, when it had a business of 90 million lei (about 21 million euros ).

On June 5, 2012, Jolidon opens the largest store - shop.jolidon.ro, thus making its debut in the online commerce environment.

References

External links
Official website
Online shop

Clothing companies of Romania
Clothing manufacturers
Underwear brands
Lingerie brands
Swimwear manufacturers